Gary Goldberg may refer to:

 Gary David Goldberg (1944–2013), American writer and producer for television and film
 Gary J. Goldberg, mining industry executive